Woodbury was a railroad station in Woodbury, New Jersey which operated from 1857–1971. The existing station house was built in 1883 in the Stick style. A new station is proposed for Glassboro–Camden Line on what has become the Vineland Secondary right-of-way.

History
The station stop was part of planned Camden and Woodbury Railroad, which began in 1837–1838 but ran irregularly and was later abandoned. The West Jersey Railroad (WJ) was granted its charter by the state of New Jersey on February 5, 1853, to build a line from Camden to Cape May. and the directors of the company met on July 15, 1853, to select the route on which they would build. The line was built in stages with the backing of the Camden and Amboy from Camden to Glassboro. The first  of the line using the abandoned Camden and Woodbury right-of-way opened on April 15, 1857.

Service was later expanded along the Penns Grove Branch and the Salem Branch, which converge just south of the station at Woodbury Junction. Through mergers and acquisitions the line became part of the West Jersey and Seashore Railroad and then Pennsylvania-Reading Seashore Lines. The line was electrified between 1906–1949. The power house north of the station was the last remnant of the electrified rail and was later demolished by Conrail. It later became diesel service.

Passenger service to Salem and Penns Grove ended in 1950.
 The remaining passenger service through Woodbury ended on February 5, 1971. The station house, was built in 1883 in the Stick style, has since become a restaurant.

Future

Woodbury is a planned station of the proposed Glassboro–Camden Line light rail system, to be located along the Vineland Secondary right-of way. The station design includes a platform station and park and ride. It would be a component of a potential Woodbury Transit Hub, part of  transit-oriented development study.

References 

Woodbury, New Jersey
Former Pennsylvania-Reading Seashore Lines stations
Railway stations in Gloucester County, New Jersey
Former railway stations in New Jersey
Railway stations closed in 1971
Proposed NJ Transit rail stations
1971 disestablishments in New Jersey
1857 establishments in New Jersey
Railway stations in the United States opened in 1857